Rotwandlspitze is a mountain of Bavaria, Germany. It forms a double peak with Brunnensteinspitze.

Mountains of Bavaria
Mountains of the Alps